Ramon Del Barrio (born Ramon G. del Barrio, May 9, 1964 in New York) is an American performer, choreographer, dancer and singer. He is sometimes credited as Raymond Del Barrio.

Career 
He has worked as director and choreographer for boy-band O-Town (J Records) on ABC’s primetime hit Making the Band.

He has performed in Chita Rivera’s  A Legendary Celebration on Broadway for BC/EFA, creating the role of Damon Runyon in the Broadway revival of Guys and Dolls. He also performed in the Las Vegas production of Jersey Boys. Among his tours are Chita Rivera: The Dancer’s Life and the 30th anniversary tour of West Side Story, in which he played Chino and Whitney Houston’s Moment of Truth World Tour. His film and television appearances includes co-star on Rob Schneider’s CBS sitcom “Rob”, The Mambo Kings, Sister Act 2, Robin Hood: Men in Tights, Footloose, Solid Gold Hits, the Academy, Grammy and American Music awards shows. He also appeared on NBC Palm Springs for NBCare tapings.

References

External links
 
 Official Site
 Bio on West Bank Story Site

1964 births
Living people
American choreographers
American male dancers
American male television actors
American male musical theatre actors